= Kampung Batu Arang =

Kampung Batu Arang is a village in Federal Territory of Labuan, Malaysia.
